Matteo Betti (born 26 November 1985) is an Italian wheelchair fencer. Born in Siena, he represented Italy at the 2008 Summer Paralympics, at the 2012 Summer Paralympics and at the 2016 Summer Paralympics and he won the bronze medal in the men's épée A event in 2012.

References

External links 
 

Living people
1985 births
Sportspeople from Siena
Italian male fencers
Wheelchair fencers at the 2008 Summer Paralympics
Wheelchair fencers at the 2012 Summer Paralympics
Wheelchair fencers at the 2016 Summer Paralympics
Medalists at the 2012 Summer Paralympics
Paralympic bronze medalists for Italy
Paralympic medalists in wheelchair fencing
Paralympic wheelchair fencers of Italy
Paralympic athletes of Fiamme Azzurre